Heather Angel may refer to:

Heather Angel (actress) (1909–1986), English actress
Heather Angel (photographer) (born 1941), British nature photographer, author and television presenter